Luca Vettori (born 26 April 1991) is an Italian volleyball player, a member of Italy men's national volleyball team and Italian club Modena Volley. He was silver medalist at the 2016 Summer  Olympics and at the  2013 European Championship, and two times bronze medalist in the World League (2013, 2014). With Modena, he won the Italian title for clubs in 2015-2016.

Career

National team
He debuted with the Italy men's national volleyball team in 2012. In 2013 Italy, including Vettori, won bronze medal of World League. In the same year he achieved silver medal of European Championship. In 2014 he and his Italian teammates won bronze of World League held in Florence, Italy. He was  also part of the team that won the silver medal in the 2016 Summer Olympics and in the 2017 FIVB Volleyball Men's World Grand Champions Cup.

Sporting achievements

Clubs

Club World Championship
  2018, with Trentino Volley

CEV Challenge Cup
  2012/2013, with Copra Elior Piacenza

National championships
 2012/2013  Italian Championship, with Copra Elior Piacenza
 2013/2014  Italian Cup, with Copra Elior Piacenza
 2014/2015  Italian Cup, with Modena Volley
 2015/2016  Italian Cup, with DHL Modena
 2015/2016  Italian SuperCup, with DHL Modena
 2015/2016  Italian Championship, with DHL Modena

National team
 2013  FIVB World League
 2013  CEV European Championship
 2014  FIVB World League
 2015  FIVB World Cup
 2016  Olympic Games

Individual
 2009 FIVB U19 World Championship - Best Scorer
 2013 CEV European Championship - Best Spiker

References

External links
LegaVolley player profile

1991 births
Living people
Sportspeople from Parma
Italian men's volleyball players
Modena Volley players
Trentino Volley players
Olympic volleyball players of Italy
Volleyball players at the 2016 Summer Olympics
Medalists at the 2016 Summer Olympics
Olympic silver medalists for Italy
Olympic medalists in volleyball
Volleyball players at the 2020 Summer Olympics
Opposite hitters